= Church of Nuestra Señora de Lourdes, Puebla =

Church in Puebla, Mexico

Church of Nuestra Señora de Lourdes
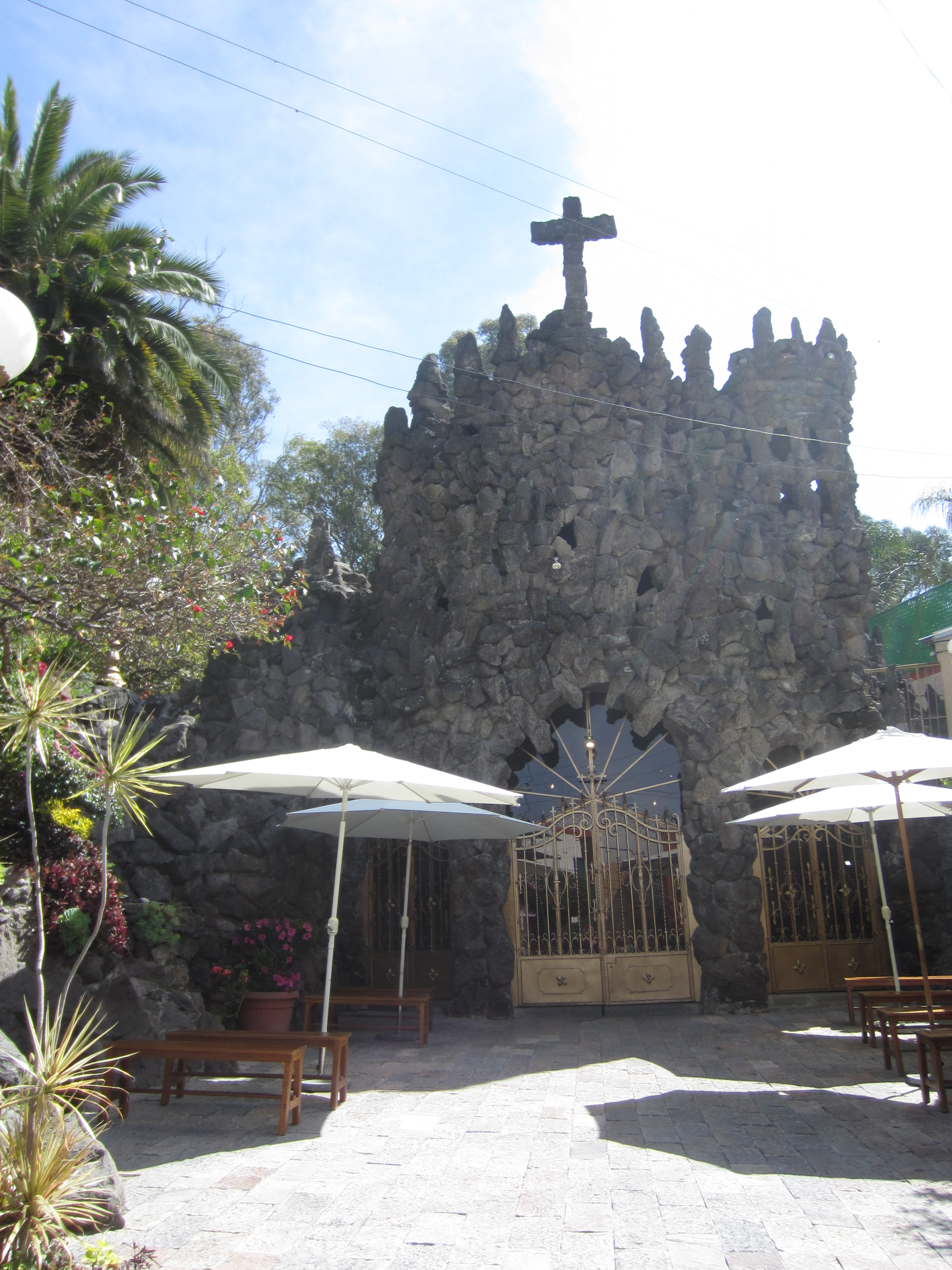
- The church's exterior, 2018

- Location within Mexico

Location
- Interactive map of Church of Nuestra Señora de Lourdes
- Coordinates: 19°3′11″N 98°11′6″W

Nuestra Señora de Lourdes, or Church of la Gruta de Lourdes, is a church in the city of Puebla, in the Mexican state of Puebla.

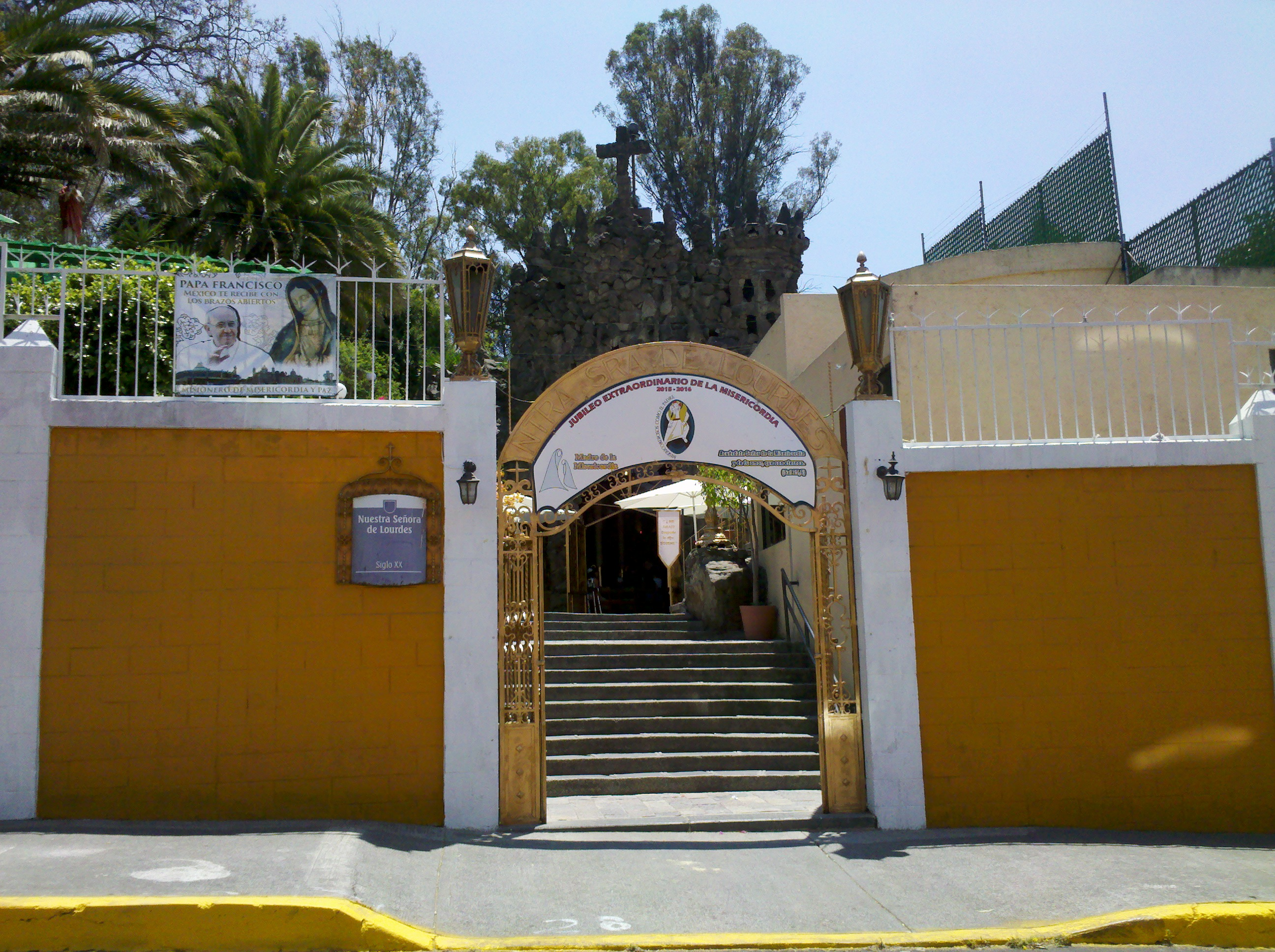
Exterior with signage, 2018
